From Bethlehem to Oblivion is the first EP and fourth release overall by Rockville, Maryland band Polkadot Cadaver.

Track listing

Track three written by Billy Hayes and Jay W. Johnson, track six is a rewrite by Polkadot Cadaver of the song The Twelve Days of Christmas, originally a traditional by Frederic Austin song with lines added by the band. All other songs written by Polkadot Cadaver.

Members
Current Members
Todd Smith — Vocals
Jasan Stepp — Guitar, Keyboards
Scott Radway — Drums
Brian "Wendy" White — Bass

References

2013 EPs
Polkadot Cadaver albums